Udea infuscalis is a moth in the family Crambidae. It was described by Zeller in 1852. It is found in South Africa (KwaZulu-Natal, Gauteng).

References

Endemic moths of South Africa
Moths described in 1852
infuscalis